David Maneiro (born 17 February 1989) is an Andorran international footballer who plays for UE Santa Coloma, as a defender.

Career
He has played club football for FC Andorra and UE Santa Coloma.

He made his international debut for Andorra in 2009.

References

External links
David Maneiro at La Preferente

1989 births
Living people
Andorran footballers
Andorra international footballers
FC Andorra players
UE Santa Coloma players
Primera Divisió players
Association football defenders
Atlètic Club d'Escaldes players